Lee-on-the-Solent railway station served the district of Lee-on-the-Solent, Hampshire, England from 1894 to 1935 on the Lee-on-Solent Line.

History 
The station opened on 12 May 1894 by the Lee-on-the-Solent Railway. It was situated on the west side of Marine Parade on the B3333. Like the rest of the halts on the line, it closed temporarily on 31 August 1914 and reopened on 1 October 1914. In 1917, a seaplane depot opened nearby and was accessible via rail. The freight traffic handled at the station was coal and building materials used for houses that were being built nearby. The station closed to passengers on 1 January 1931 and to goods traffic on 30 September 1935.

References

External links 

Disused railway stations in Hampshire
Railway stations in Great Britain opened in 1894
Railway stations in Great Britain closed in 1931
1894 establishments in England
1935 disestablishments in England